Harold Paul "Babe" Danzig (April 30, 1887 – July 14, 1931) was a first baseman in Major League Baseball, playing for the Boston Red Sox in 1909.

Career

Danzig was born in Binghamton, New York to German immigrants, and started his professional baseball career in 1906. In 1907, Danzig played for the New Bedford Whalers of the New England League. He batted .289 and led the league in slugging percentage, total bases, and triples. The following season, he moved over to the Pacific Coast League and was again one of the premiere hitters. The PCL was not strong offensively that year, and Danzig won the batting title at .298. He also topped the circuit with 39 doubles.

Danzig joined the Red Sox roster for 1909 and made his major league debut on April 12, at the age of 21. He appeared in a total of six MLB games in April and May and got 2 hits in 13 at bats, for a batting average of .154. He was then released by the Red Sox and never played in the majors again. Danzig finished out the season in the New England League, batting .354 in 64 games.

In 1910, Danzig returned to the Pacific Coast League. He played the next two seasons for the Sacramento Sacts, then one season in the Southern Association, and then some semi-pro baseball in Northern California. He was the first baseman and cleanup hitter for the Best Tractors as late as 1919.

Danzig died in San Francisco, California, at the age of 44.

References

External links

1887 births
1931 deaths
American people of German descent
Major League Baseball first basemen
Boston Red Sox players
New Bedford Whalers (baseball) players
Portland Beavers players
Lowell Tigers players
Sacramento Sacts players
Montgomery Rebels players
Oakland Oaks (baseball) players
Baseball players from New York (state)
Sportspeople from Binghamton, New York
Oswego (minor league baseball) players